Tommie Williams is an American politician from the state of Georgia. He is a member of the Republican Party and was first elected to the Georgia Senate in 1998.  Williams represented the 19th district, which encompassed Appling, Jeff Davis, Long, Montgomery, Toombs, Wayne, Wheeler, and parts of Liberty and Tattnall Counties. He was selected as Senate Majority Leader in 2005, and was voted President Pro Tempore of the Senate in 2009.
Williams announced his retirement in March 2016, and did not seek re-election. In 2018, he was appointed by U.S. Agriculture Secretary Sonny Perdue to be Minister-Counselor for Agriculture at the U.S. Mission to the United Nations Agencies for Food and Agriculture in Rome, Italy.

Biography 
Tommie Williams began his career as an onion farmer in Toombs county, was a public school teacher, and is currently a tree farmer.

He received a bachelor's degree at the University of Georgia, and a master's degree in education at Georgia Southern University.

Senate career 
Williams was first elected to the State Senate in 1998, after winning a three-way primary. Beginning in 2006, he had had no primary challengers until his retirement in 2017.

In 2005, Williams was chosen as Senate Majority Leader. He served in that role until 2009, when he was voted President Pro Tempore, the second highest position in the Senate, behind Lieutenant Governor. He was also Chairman of the Administrative Affairs Committee from 2009 to 2013.

In August 2011, Senator Williams was asked by members of the press if he was interested in running against U.S.Congressman John Barrow, in whose district he resides. Williams indicated that it did interest him, however, he would still be running for re-election to his Senate seat.

Senator Williams endorsed Newt Gingrich for president in the 2012 Republican presidential primaries.

On June 4, 2012, Senator Williams sent an open letter to the Senate Republican Caucus and to members of the press in which he stated his intentions to forgo seeking re-election for the position of President Pro Tempore. His reasons included spending more time with his family, as inspired by the movie Courageous, and his belief that leadership positions should be rotated or term-limited.

Election history

1998

2000

2002

2004

2006

2008

2010

2012

2014

References

External links 

 Official Election Results

University of Georgia alumni
Georgia Southern University alumni
Living people
Politicians from Atlanta
Republican Party Georgia (U.S. state) state senators
People from Lyons, Georgia
21st-century American politicians
Presidents pro tempore of the Georgia State Senate
Year of birth missing (living people)